The Revere City Hall and Police Station, located at 281 Broadway and 23 Pleasant Street, are the municipal heart of the city of Revere, Massachusetts.  City Hall, a distinctive landmark on one of the city's major roads, is a -story brick Colonial Revival building that was built in 1897–98 to a design by Greenleaf and Cobb.  The former police station, also a Colonial Revival brick building, was built in 1909 to a design by Hurd and Gore, and is situated just east of City Hall on the same parcel of land.

The city hall building was built at a time when Revere was still a town, and was first known as Town Hall; in addition to municipal offices, it initially also housed the public library.  It was built on roughly the same site as Revere's first town hall, an 1835 Greek Revival structure destroyed by fire in 1897.  Revere was reincorporated as a city in 1915.  The former police station building served its original purpose for about 100 years, when the police were moved to new facilities on Revere Beach Parkway.

The buildings were listed on the National Register of Historic Places in 2012.

See also
National Register of Historic Places listings in Suffolk County, Massachusetts

References

Colonial Revival architecture in Massachusetts
Revere, Massachusetts
Revere
Government buildings completed in 1852
National Register of Historic Places in Suffolk County, Massachusetts
Government buildings on the National Register of Historic Places in Massachusetts
1852 establishments in Massachusetts
City and town halls on the National Register of Historic Places in Massachusetts